Mard or MARD may refer to:

Films 
 Mard (1985 film), a Hindi-language Indian film directed by Manmohan Desai
 Mard (1998 film), a Hindi-language Indian film directed by Ganpa Bohra

Places 

 Mard, Chaharmahal and Bakhtiari, a village in Chaharmahal and Bakhtiari Province, Iran
 Mared (village), a village in Khuzestan Province, Iran
 Mard Castle, in Dumat Al-Jandal, Saudi Arabia

Other uses 
 Maharashtra Association of Resident Doctors, an Indian medical association
 Main Assisted Reserve Deployment (MARD), a skydive safety device
 Men Against Rape and Discrimination, an Indian social campaign
 Ministry of Agriculture and Rural Development (Vietnam), a government ministry in Vietnam
 Olof Mård (born 1989), Swedish footballer

See also 
 Mard o mard (literally man to man), an ancient Persian tradition of single combat
 Khard Mard (disambiguation)
 Saint-Mard (disambiguation)
 Shir-e Mard (disambiguation)
 
 Mart (disambiguation)